|}

The Tolworth Novices' Hurdle is a Grade 1 National Hunt hurdle race in Great Britain which is open to horses aged four years or older. It is run at Sandown Park over a distance of about 2 miles (1 mile 7 furlongs and 216 yards, or 3,215 metres), and during its running there are eight hurdles to be jumped. The race is for novice hurdlers, and it is scheduled to take place each year in January. From 2011 to 2018 the race was sponsored by online casino 32Red and was run as the 32Red Hurdle between 2011 and 2013. Since 2019 it has been sponsored by Unibet

The race was first run in 1976.

Records
Leading jockey (3 wins):
 Norman Williamson – Silver Wedge (1995), Monsignor (2000), Miros (2002)
 Ruby Walsh - Silverburn (2007), Breedsbreeze (2008), Yorkhill (2016)
 Barry Geraghty - Minella Class (2011), Captain Conan (2012), L'ami Serge (2015)

Leading trainer (6 wins):
 Nicky Henderson – New York Rainbow (1992), Minella Class (2011), Captain Conan (2012), Royal Boy (2014), L'ami Serge (2015), Constitution Hill (2022)

Winners

See also
 Horse racing in Great Britain
 List of British National Hunt races

References

 Racing Post:
 , 

 pedigreequery.com – Tolworth Hurdle – Sandown.

External links
 Race Recordings 

National Hunt races in Great Britain
Sandown Park Racecourse
National Hunt hurdle races
1976 establishments in England
Recurring sporting events established in 1976